Yevgeniy Prokopchik (born 13 March 1993) is a Belarusian professional footballer.

References

External links 
 
 

1993 births
Living people
People from Braslaw District
Sportspeople from Vitebsk Region
Belarusian footballers
Association football defenders
FC Torpedo-BelAZ Zhodino players
FC Energetik-BGU Minsk players
FC Bereza-2010 players
FC Orsha players
FC Lokomotiv Gomel players
FC Oshmyany players